Ernesto Núñez Aguilar (born 28 February 1979) is a Mexican politician affiliated with the PVEM. He currently serves as Deputy of the LXII Legislature of the Mexican Congress representing Michoacán.

References

1979 births
Living people
Politicians from Michoacán
Ecologist Green Party of Mexico politicians
21st-century Mexican politicians
Deputies of the LXII Legislature of Mexico
Members of the Chamber of Deputies (Mexico) for Michoacán